PixelPaint is a pixel-based image editor application by Pixel Resources, Inc., a Norcross, GA based company, and distributed by SuperMac Technology, no longer maintained, for the Macintosh series of computers.

It was the first full-color paint application for the Macintosh.  

Jerry Harris, co-creator of PixelPaint, subsequently became an executive for Adobe Systems.

Reception
BYTE in 1989 listed PixelPaint as among the "Distinction" winners of the BYTE Awards, stating that it "helped establish the Mac II ... as a tool for serious graphic art".

References

Raster graphics editors 
Macintosh-only software